Hakea victoria,  commonly known as royal hakea and lantern hakea, is a shrub endemic to Western Australia and noted for its ornamental foliage. The Noongar name for the plant is Tallyongut.

Description
The leaves are rough and leathery, the margin wavy with prickly teeth and ending with a sharp point. The lower leaves are green and narrow, the upper leaves are broad, concave, more or less circular,  yellow at the base and shading to green at the apex. The inflorescence is a cluster of 26-42  small cream-white, red or pink flowers in leaf axils that are almost obscured by the leaf shape. Flowering occurs from June to October. The woody fruits are about 25 mm long and between 15 and 20 mm wide.

Taxonomy and naming
The type specimen of  Hakea victoria was collected near West Mount Barren (located in what is now Fitzgerald River National Park) by botanist James Drummond and was first described by him in 1847 in The Inquirer newspaper. The specific epithet is named in honour of Queen Victoria by the naturalist John Gilbert.

Distribution and habitat
Royal hakea grows in quartzitic or lateritic sand mostly in rocky locations  in the coastal region between Albany and Esperance, including the Fitzgerald River National Park.

Cultivation
The species requires a well-drained, sunny situation and will tolerate moderate frost. Plants are not suited to humid conditions; even if they survive, foliage colour will be poor. Propagation is easy by seed, but quite difficult from cuttings.

References

victoria
Eudicots of Western Australia
Plants described in 1847
Taxa named by James Drummond (botanist)